Ahmadiyya is an Islamic religious movement originating in 1889 in northern India around the teachings of Mirza Ghulam Ahmad (1835–1908), who claimed to have been divinely appointed as both the promised Mahdi and Messiah expected by Muslims to appear towards the end times.

 the Community has been established in 209 countries and territories of the world. with concentrations in South Asia, West Africa, East Africa and Indonesia. The Community is a minority Muslim group in almost every country of the world. On the other hand, it has spread to most countries of the world. In some countries, it is practically illegal to be an Ahmadi Muslim. For instance, in Pakistan, following Ordinance XX, Ahmadis cannot call themselves Muslims, profess the Islamic creed publicly or call their places of worship mosques. The religious slur "Qadiani" has been used against Ahmadi Muslims and the community has also been persecuted. Together, these factors make it difficult to estimate the Ahmadiyya population for both the Community itself and as well as independent organizations. For this reason, the Community gives a figure of "tens of millions"; however, most independent sources variously estimate the population to be at least 10 to 20 million worldwide, thereby representing around 1% of the world's Muslim population.

According to the World Christian Encyclopedia, the Ahmadiyya movement is the fastest growing Islamic group as of the early 21st century. The country with the largest Ahmadiyya population is Pakistan, with an estimated 4 million Ahmadi Muslims. Excluding small nations, the country with the largest proportion of Ahmadi Muslims to the wider Muslim population is Ghana, standing at 16%. The country with the highest percentage of the overall population is Sierra Leone standing at over 8%.

The population is almost entirely contained in the single, organized and united movement, commonly referred to as the Ahmadiyya Muslim Community (AMC), headed by the Khalifa. The other is the Lahore Ahmadiyya Movement, a separatist group which, though historically significant, has failed to attract a sizeable following representing less than 0.2% of the total Ahmadiyya population.

Countries

Maps

The following maps summarize the data presented in the table below.

Table

The following figures display estimates of the number of Ahmadi Muslims and their percentages by country. However, it does not list all the countries with the Ahmadiyya presence. In particular, it does not list a number of countries which have a large presence of Ahmadis. This includes Benin, Burkina Faso, Ivory Coast, Guinea, The Gambia and a number of Arab States.

See also
Islam:
Islam by country
Shia Muslims in the Arab world

Other religions:
Baháʼí Faith by country
Buddhism by country
Christianity by country
Hinduism by country
Judaism by country
Sikhism by country

References

Notes

Citations